Longipteryx is a genus of prehistoric bird which lived during the Early Cretaceous (Aptian stage, 120.3 million years ago). It contains a single species, Longipteryx chaoyangensis. Its remains have been recovered from the Jiufotang Formation at Chaoyang in Liaoning Province, China. Apart from the holotype IVPP V 12325 - a fine and nearly complete skeleton — another entire skeleton (IPPV V 12552) and some isolated bones (a humerus and furcula, specimens IPPV V 12553, and an ulna, IPPV V 12554) are known to date.

The name Longipteryx means "one with long feathers", from Latin longus, "long" + Ancient Greek pteryx (πτέρυξ), "wing", "feather" or "pinion". The specific name chaoyangensis is from the Latin for "from Chaoyang".

Description

Excluding the tail, Longipteryx was some 15 cm long overall in life. It had a long bill — longer than the rest of the head — with a few hooked teeth at the tip, and, as the name implies, proportionally long and strong wings. Although it was basal to the extent that it had two long separate fingers with claws and a stubby thumb, the flight apparatus was generally quite well developed, and unlike most other birds of its time it possessed uncinate processes which strengthened the ribcage. Its claws and toes were long and strong while the leg was quite short. Altogether, the ability to fly and to perch was quite sophisticated for its age, to the detriment of terrestrial locomotion: the humerus was 1.56 times the length of the femur.

The holotype retains many feather impressions, though poorly preserved; remiges do not seem to have been preserved, and what feathers remain are apparently only body feathers, wing coverts and down. The end of the tail is destroyed in the holotype; no rectrices are preserved and while the pygostyle is complete in other skeletons, only halos of short feathers are preserved. While the related Shanweiniao and some other enantiornithines preserve two, four, or eight long display feathers on the tail, the absence of such feathers in any known specimen of Longipteryx probably indicates that they were absent in this species.

Longipteryx probably dived or probed for fish, crustaceans, or other aquatic animals of appropriate size. Altogether, it was perhaps closest to a modern-day kingfisher in its ecological niche. A study on Mesozoic avian diets does indeed recover it as a piscivore, but a posterior study notes that it is far too smaller to have been a fish-eater, since even similar sized kingfishers are primarily insectivorous. It instead suggests a semi-raptorial lifestyle, using its talons (similar to those of owls) to grab large insects.

Classification
 
The affiliations of Longipteryx are not resolved. While it has been sometimes included in the Enantiornithes and groups specifically with Euenantiornithes in some cladistic analyses, it might be basal to or in Enantiornithes, being somewhat reminiscent of the equally puzzling Protopteryx. Its plesiomorphies are comprehensive, as can be expected from its old age, but the autapomorphies appear quite "modern", especially compared to other early Enantiornithes.

A distinct order (Longipterygiformes) and family (Longipterygidae) has been proposed for it. Given that neither its exact relationships nor any close relatives are presently known, not much can be said about the phylogenetic position of L. chaoyangensis. On the other hand, Longirostravis hani, described a few years after Longipteryx, appears to be phylogenetically closer to the present taxon than other Mesozoic birds and indeed they might constitute a clade of early specialized Euenantiornithes. If this is correct, they might well be considered as an order, in which case Longirostravisiformes and Longirostravisidae would become junior synonyms of Longipterygiformes and Longipterygidae, respectively.

References

Footnotes

External links
 

Bird genera
Early Cretaceous birds of Asia
Fossil taxa described in 2001
Jiufotang fauna
Longipterygids